"Amnesia" is a song by Australian pop rock band 5 Seconds of Summer, taken from their self-titled debut album 5 Seconds of Summer (2014). The mellow pop rock slow jam was announced as a new single during a live stream by the band on 1 July 2014, and was released to American contemporary hit radio as the third single from the album on 15 July 2014.

Music video
A lyric video was produced for the song. Filmed in Los Angeles, it was posted on the official Vevo and YouTube channel of the band on 2 July 2014, at midnight, after their live stream. The video, focuses on a bedroom, though in some scenes, the members of the band appear in a close up. During the whole video, the lyrics are projected in the room or on the members' faces.

A music video directed by Isaac Rentz was also filmed, in which the band members and some girls and boys play around in several different scenes, diving into a pool fully clothed, playing golf on cars, etc. There are also several close-ups of the band-members singing along to the words of the song throughout the video. There are only three girls because they see the watcher and fans as the fourth one. The video was filmed from the fourth girl's perspective.

The video is also the third most viewed by 5 Seconds of Summer. It reached 100 million views on 11 August 2016. As of March 2022, it has 188 million views.

Extended play
An extended play was released in 2014 which contains four tracks: "Amnesia", "Daylight", "American Idiot", and "Amnesia - Live At Wembley".

B-side
A B-side was released in 2016 which contains three tracks: Daylight", "American Idiot", and "Amnesia - Live At Wembley".

Track listing

7" vinyl
"Amnesia" – 3:57
"American Idiot" – 3:03

Charts

Weekly charts

Year-end charts

Certifications

Release history

Personnel
Luke Hemmings – lead vocals
Michael Clifford – backing vocals, acoustic guitar
Calum Hood – lead vocals
Ashton Irwin – backing vocals, drums

Covers
 During the summer of 2015, the French singer Whities released a French version of the song. "Amnésia (French Version)": which was released in July with an accompanying video available on YouTube and Dailymotion.

References

2014 songs
2014 singles
2010s ballads
5 Seconds of Summer songs
Capitol Records singles
Pop ballads
Rock ballads
Song recordings produced by Sam Watters
Songs written by Benji Madden
Songs written by Joel Madden
Songs written by Louis Biancaniello
Songs written by Sam Watters